Dangorayo District is a district in the northeastern Nugal region of Somalia. Its capital is Dangorayo.

References

Districts of Somalia
Nugal, Somalia